The International School of Stuttgart (ISS) operates from Kindergarten through grade 12 on campuses in the Degerloch (main and original campus) and Sindelfingen areas of Stuttgart organized on the International Baccalaureate program. The school is home to a co-educational, multi-cultural student body of over 820 students from over 45 countries.

History
ISS was founded in 1985. The Sindelfingen campus was opened in 2003 and caters to students from the Early Years to grade 10.

Curriculum and accreditation
The International School of Stuttgart is approved and accredited by the European Council of International Schools and the New England Association of Schools and Colleges, and recognized by the state government of Baden-Württemberg. ISS is a member of the Association of German International Schools and the Council of International Schools.

The Sindelfingen offers a bilingual environment, with students being taught in both German and English and catering to a more local context. The IB Programme is introduced from grade 6 onwards.

References

External links

ISS Welcome Page
Teacher Horizons Page for ISS
Baden-Württemberg Study Guide Page on International Schools

International Baccalaureate schools in Germany
International schools in Germany
Schools in Stuttgart
Educational institutions established in 1985
1985 establishments in West Germany